Ibrahim Rafeeq was the Minister of Housing and Urban Development of the Maldives from 2005 to 2008. A native of Fuvahmulah, Rafeeq is the managing director of the Rainbow group consisting of Rainbow Enterprises Pvt. Ltd., Rainbow Construction Pvt. Ltd. and Rainland Developers Pvt. Ltd. in the Maldives.

References

Government ministers of the Maldives
Living people
Year of birth missing (living people)